Packera streptanthifolia is a species of flowering plant in the aster family known by the common name Rocky Mountain groundsel. It is native to western North America from Alaska to California to New Mexico, where it can be found in mountain habitat including woodlands and rocky slopes.

It is a perennial herb producing usually one erect stem, sometimes a cluster of a few stems, 10 to 60 centimeters in maximum height. The spatula-shaped basal leaves have oval or lance-shaped blades on long petioles. They are thick, firm, and sometimes somewhat succulent. Leaves higher on the stem are smaller, thinner, and simpler, and may lack petioles.

The inflorescence is a loose array of two or more flower heads with yellow disc florets and usually either 8 or 13 yellow ray florets up to a centimeter long each.

External links
Jepson Manual Treatment of Packera streptanthifolia
USDA Plants Profile for Packera streptanthifolia
Flora of North America
Washington Burke Museum
UC CalPhotos gallery of Packera streptanthifolia

streptanthifolia
Flora of the Western United States
Flora of Alaska
Flora of California
Flora of Colorado
Flora of the Rocky Mountains
Flora of the Sierra Nevada (United States)
Taxa named by Edward Lee Greene
Flora without expected TNC conservation status